This disambiguation page is about the plural form.  For the singular, see Blue Devil (disambiguation).

Blue Devils may refer to:

Military history
 Blue Devils (aerobatic team), the nickname of the 410 (F) Squadron Aerobatic Team, a Canadian military aerobatic team from 1949 to 1950
The Fighting Blue Devils, the nickname of the 88th Infantry Division of the United States Army in World War II
Blue Devils, the nickname of the Chasseurs Alpins, the elite mountain infantry of the French Army
Blue Devils, a reference to the United States Army by the Confederate Army during the Civil War; see List of nicknames of United States Army divisions

Music
 "Blue Devils", a military march by Charles Williams, originally known as "The Kensington March"
 Blue Devils Drum and Bugle Corps, a drum and bugle corps from Concord, California
 Oklahoma City Blue Devils, a territory jazz band based in Oklahoma
 The Last of the Blue Devils, a 1979 documentary of Kansas City jazz

Sports

College and professional
 Belconnen Blue Devils, a football (soccer) team that formerly played in the New South Wales Premier League (Australia)
 Blue Devils FC, a Canadian semi-professional soccer team
 Central Connecticut Blue Devils, athletic teams from Central Connecticut State University
 Duke Blue Devils, athletic teams from Duke University in Durham, North Carolina
 Hamburg Blue Devils, an American football team that plays in the German Football League
 Fredonia State Blue Devils, athletic teams from the State University of New York at Fredonia
 Lawrence Tech Blue Devils, athletic teams from Lawrence Technological University
 UW–Stout Blue Devils, athletic teams from the University of Wisconsin–Stout

High school athletic teams in the United States
Booneville High School, Booneville, Mississippi
 Brunswick High School (Ohio), Brunswick (Cleveland), Ohio
 Celeste High School, Celeste, Texas
 Central High School (Davenport, Iowa)
 Davis Senior High School (California), Davis, California
 Ellenville High School, Ellenville, New York
 Greencastle-Antrim High School, Greencastle, Pennsylvania
 Grosse Pointe South High School, Grosse Pointe, Michigan
 Jackson County High School, Gainesboro, Tennessee
 Kenmore West High School, Kenmore, New York
 Lake Fenton High School, Linden, Michigan
 Leominster High School, Leominster, Massachusetts
 Mortimer Jordan High School, Kimberly, Alabama
 Old Forge Junior-Senior High School, Pennsylvania
 Plainville High School, Plainville, Connecticut
 Quincy Senior High School, Quincy, Illinois
 Reading High School (Ohio), Reading, Ohio
 Riverland Community College, Austin, Minnesota
 Victor Senior High School, Victor, New York
 Westfield High School (New Jersey), Westfield, New Jersey
 Walla Walla High School, Walla Walla, Washington
 Kennett High School, Kennett Square, Pennsylvania

Other uses
Blue devils, demons causing depression, according to some the etymology of the blues music genre

See also
Blue Devil (disambiguation)
Blue Demons, athletic teams from DePaul University